Pimpalkutti is a village and a railway station in Yavatmal district of Maharashtra State in India.
This is the last village and last railway station in Maharashtra on NH7 and Nagpur – Adilabad line respectively.

Villages in Yavatmal district